Xenobarbus loveridgei is a species of cyprinid fish endemic to Tanzania where it is found in Lake Victoria.  It is the only species in its genus. The species is rare and only known from a few specimens.

References

Cyprinid fish of Africa
Fish of Lake Victoria
Fish described in 1923